A Darracq and Company Limited owned a French manufacturer of motor vehicles and aero engines in Suresnes, near Paris. The French enterprise, known at first as A. Darracq et Cie, was founded in 1896 by Alexandre Darracq after he sold his Gladiator Bicycle business. In 1902, it took effect in 1903, he sold his new business to a privately held English company named A Darracq and Company Limited, taking a substantial shareholding and a directorship himself.

Alexandre Darracq continued to run the business from Paris but was obliged to retire to the Côte d'Azur in 1913 following years of difficulties that brought Darracq & Co into very hazardous financial circumstances. He had introduced an unproven unorthodox engine in 1911 which proved a complete failure yet he neglected Suresnes' popular conventional products. France then entered the first World War.

He died in 1931 but long before that, in 1920, the name of A Darracq & Co 1905 was changed to STD Motors Limited. Then, in 1922, Darracq's name was dropped from all products, the Suresnes business was renamed Automobiles Talbot and the Suresnes products were branded just Talbot. His Suresnes business continued, still under British control, under the name Talbot until 1935 when it was acquired by investors led by the Suresnes factory's managing director, Antonio Lago.

STD Motors Limited, previously known until 1920 as A Darracq and Company (1905) Limited became insolvent and was liquidated during 1935 and 1936.

History of the business
Alexandre Darracq, using part of the substantial profit he had made from selling his Gladiator bicycle factory to Adolpe Clément, set up a plant in 1897 in the Paris suburb of Suresnes. The company to own the business was formed in 1897 and named A Darracq et Cie. Production began with a Millet motorcycle powered by a five-cylinder rotary engine. Shortly followed by an electric brougham. In 1898 Darracq et Cie made a Léon Bollée-designed voiturette tricar. The voiturette proved a débâcle: the steering was problematic, the five-speed belt drive "a masterpiece of bad design", and the hot tube ignition crude, proving the £10,000 Darracq et Cie had paid for the design a mistake.

Darracq et Cie produced its first vehicle with an internal combustion engine in 1900. While not as successful as hoped, one hundred were sold. In 1902 Darracq & Co signed a contract with Adam Opel to jointly produce, under licence, vehicles in the German Empire with the brand name "Opel Darracq". Opel soon moved on to building their own vehicles.

London

A Darracq et Cie was sold as of 30 September 1902 (the sale was not completed until the following year) to an English company, A Darracq and Company Limited. The attraction for the British venture capitalists was that French automobile technology and industry experience led the world. It was incorporated in England because French law made the necessary flotation processes more difficult than English law. The perception from across the Atlantic in USA was that French industry was "offloading" on British investors. The English financial group was headed by W.B. Avery of W & T Avery Limited, a Birmingham scales manufacturer, J S Smith-Winby a London lawyer and a retired army officer, Colonel A Rawlinson. They bought A Darracq et Cie and then sold it again to other investors for five times their purchase price. Darracq received slightly less than 50 percent of the shares in the new company. There was no public offering, eight other investors took up the rest of the shares.

Further capital was raised and large sums were spent on factory expansion. The Suresnes site was expanded to some four acres in extent, and in England extensive premises were bought.

The Darracq & Co automobile company prospered, such that, by 1903, four models were offered: a 1.1-litre single, a 1.3 L and 1.9 L twin, and a 3.8 L four. The 1904 models abandoned flitch-plated wood chassis for pressed steel, and the new Flying Fifteen, powered by a 3-litre four, had its chassis made from a single sheet of steel. This car was Alexandre Darracq's chef d'oeuvre. There was nothing outstanding in its design but "every part was in such perfect balance and harmony" it became an outstanding model. Its exceptional quality helped the company capture a ten percent share of the French auto market. In late 1904 the chairman reported sales were up by 20 per cent though increased costs meant the profit had risen more slowly. But what was more important was they had many more orders than they could fill and the only solution was to enlarge the factory by as much as 50 per cent. Almost 75 per cent of 1904 output was exported.

At the following Annual meeting, twelve months later, the chairman was able to tell shareholders all the six speed records of the automobile world were held by Darracq cars and they had all been held more than twelve months and yet another had recently been added by K Lee Guinness. He also reported that during 1905 a large property had been bought in Lambeth for examining adjusting and stocking new cars ready for the peak sales period.

An announcement followed two days later of a scheme of reconstitution of the company to raise more capital for further expansion. The reconstituted company was named A Darracq and Company (1905) Limited.  Paris resident Alexander Darracq remained managing director, Rawlinson was appointed managing director of the London branch. The "reconstitution" was to circumvent some holders of the company's shares who were unwilling to share the prosperity and blocked proposed new issues. So the company was (technically) sold, they were paid out and obliged to buy new shares like anyone else. J S Smith-Winby continued as chairman.  After this "reconstitution" over 80 per cent of the shares were held in England.

Meanwhile, there was a move towards building larger cars and by 1907 there was one model with an 11.5-litre engine.

Alexandre Darracq had long been interested in heavy vehicles for the carriage of people and the transport of goods. On his advice the company entered into a joint venture with Léon Serpollet in 1905 to build steam-powered buses. A new factory was built at Suresnes capable of making one hundred chassis each month but the buses were not successful and in 1910 the directors had to tell their shareholders they had written off £156,000 of their investment in heavy steam vehicles.

M. Alexandre Darracq retires

In April 1908, the directors found it necessary to formally deny rumours of M. Darracq's intention to resign noting his contract did not expire until September 1910.

Returning to an 1898 idea by Alexandre Darracq to build low-cost, good-quality cars, much as Henry Ford was doing with the Model T, Darracq & Co introduced a £260  model at the very end of 1911. These, at the founder's insistence, would all be cursed with the Henriod rotary valve engine, which was underpowered and prone to seizing. The new engine's failure was reported by Darracq & Co to its shareholders to be no more than the difficulty of achieving quantity production. It proved disastrous to the marque, and eventually Alexandre Darracq retired.

Owen Clegg
In late 1911, Alexandre Darracq was replaced by a new managing director, chief engineer Paul Ribeyrolles, one-time head of Darracq's Gladiator Cycle Company and, unlike Darracq, a motor racing enthusiast. In June 1912, Darracq, surrounded by "new blood", resigned, he had already successfully speculated on then sold all his shares. A main board director, Hopkins, was sent to Paris to take charge of general administration and Owen Clegg was sent to Suresnes from Rover in Coventry and appointed works manager. At the end of 1912, the chairman reassured shareholders a return on their investment in the valveless motor would arrive in 1913.

By February 1913, shareholders had set up their own inquiry into the unsatisfactory position of their business and it reported poor co-operation between London and Suresnes, they had been pulling against each other, furthermore there had been considerable loss through "recent changes in personnel". The committee then went on record saying: 
"M. Darracq, as a typical Frenchman, probably possessed far more originality and initiative than any Englishman of corresponding situation, but, if he displayed a failing, it was that he, like most of his brilliant race, lacked the Englishman's pertinacity, and, after a time, seemed to lose interest, as it were, in his original conceptions without making any serious effort to strike out a fresh line."

The chairman of the investigating committee, Norman Craig, was appointed chairman of A Darracq and Company (1905).

New works manager Owen Clegg, designer of the proven Rover Twelve, sensibly copied the Twelve for Darracq & Co's new model. The factory at Suresnes was retooled for mass production, making it one of the first in the industry to do so. The 16HP Clegg-Darracq was joined by an equally reliable 2.1-litre 12HP car, and soon the factory was turning out sixty cars a week; by 1914, 12,000 men rolled out fourteen cars a day.

Automobiles Darracq S.A.
For the First World War, the Darracq & Co factory was switched to the production of various war materials. In 1916, aside from the land and buildings all the Suresnes assets were transferred to Société Anonyme Automobiles Darracq, a new company incorporated in France for the purpose, British assets were transferred to a British company named Darracq Motor Engineering Company Limited. A Darracq and Company (1905) Limited was now no more than a holder of shares in these two businesses. Suresnes land and buildings were transferred to Darracq Proprietary Company Limited of London and leased back to SA Darracq.

A conglomerate
After the Armistice of 11 November 1918, A Darracq and Company (1905) Limited bought Heenan & Froude, constructional engineers, of Worcester and Manchester, then at the end of 1919 Darracq & Co bought Clément-Talbot Limited and early in 1920 Jonas Woodhead & Sons of Leeds, suppliers of springs for cars. In June 1920 they bought control of Sunbeam Motor Car Company Limited and in August W & G Du Cros Limited of Acton, taxi operators and van, lorry, bus and ambulance body builders.

S.T.D. Motors

In August 1920,  A Darracq and Company (1905) was renamed S T D Motors Limited to recognise the gathering together of Sunbeam Talbot and Darracq under one ownership. The Sunbeam car would continue to be made at Moorfield Works, Wolverhampton, the Talbot at Clément-Talbot in North Kensington and the Darracq car at Suresnes. There would now be central buying selling administration and advertising departments all with STD in Britain All businesses retained their separate identities.

Talbot-Darracq
Following the inclusion of Clément Talbot in the S T D group Suresnes products were branded Talbot-Darracq but the word Darracq was dropped in 1922. Cars made by Automobiles Talbot imported from France to England were renamed Darracq —for the first two years they were badged Talbot Darracq— to avoid confusion with the English Clément-Talbot products.

They were imported and sold in England by Darracq Motor Engineering Company Limited.

STD Motors Limited group in 1924
 Clément-Talbot of North Kensington, London: Talbot cars
 Darracq Motor Engineering Company of Fulham London: motorcar bodies
 Sunbeam Motor Car Company of Moorfield, Wolverhampton: Sunbeam cars
 Jonas Woodhead & Sons of Osset, Leeds: automobile springs
in France
 Automobiles Talbot France of Suresnes, Paris: Talbot cars
 Darracq Proprietary Company Limited of North Kensington, London W10: held those French assets not held by Talbot SA
other investments
 W & G Du Cros of Warple Way Acton, London W3: W & G commercial vehicles, Yellow Taxi-cabs, charabanc and bus bodies, motorcar bodies and assembly of French-sourced Talbot components for sale in the British market as Darracq-Talbot cars.
 Heenan & Froude of Worcester, constructional engineers

In early 1924, STD Motors went to the public to borrow funds amounting to around 15 per cent of its fully paid capital. No purpose for the borrowing was published but it is believed to have been to fund Coatalen's ambitions for the group's racing cars. Increased profits did not materialise and within five years the group's financial reserves were exhausted and plant and machinery was becoming obsolete and the group's products were becoming outmoded. After certain undertakings were made to their bankers the company's preference shareholders received their 1925–1926 dividend — in 1929. The financial problems of the 1920s were thought to have been ended by a court-sanctioned financial reconstruction in June 1930. At that time, the substantial accumulated losses were recognised and the ordinary capital chopped down to one-third of its value. Financial commentators could see that the only assets were shares in or loans to other companies making evaluation difficult.

Price Waterhouse & Co was commissioned to report to the board on the financial situation but the board only released a brief summary of Price Waterhouse's recommendations. The report's main criticism was the failure of the board to coordinate the members of the group. Much greater centralisation was recommended as well as standardisation.

In late March 1931, the suggestion was made by a specially called committee of shareholders that some "new blood" should be introduced to the board of directors. In response the entire STD Motors' board of directors resigned. An entirely new board was appointed under the chairmanship of General Sir Travers Clarke. The new board immediately set to work to prepare to implement most of the Price Waterhouse recommendations. Its members were: Messrs. Clarke (chair), Marrian, Newcombe, Neylan and Lord Queenborough.
  This board remained in place until the end of the business. At the end of 1931, the chairman reported a small loss for STD Motors but having, for the first time, synchronised reporting for the nine trading subsidiaries no one was quite clear about the year's real profits or losses of the group but they did at least now have a proper grip of the extent of the group's assets and liabliilites. Eighteen months later another capital reduction / scheme of arrangement was announced. The 1924 borrowings fell due for repayment in early 1934. The board was unable to find a way to repay them or replace them with a new loan. The situation was without hope and negotiations began for a sale of the constituent businesses for cash to repay loans. They were not successful. S T D again asked their lenders for more time to find cash to pay interest.

Disintegration
Two days later, just before the opening of the October 1934 Motor Show at Olympia, "Crisp and Another" (trustees of the lenders' trust deed) applied to the High Court, Chancery Division, for the appointment of receivers to Sunbeam and Clément-Talbot. In the end, profit-making Clément-Talbot was saved the ignominy of receivership and STD was able to sell it as and when the directors chose.

William Lyons was finishing his SS 100 sports car and let it be known that he believed he had a binding agreement with S T D Motors to purchase Sunbeam's name and trademarks thus upgrading his very moderately priced new car. In January, unbeknownst to Lyons, a provisional agreement was made with Rootes Securities, and from that time the Rootes brothers controlled Clément-Talbot and Darracq Motor Engineering Company though Rootes would have to wait for the end of the legal proceedings to collect Sunbeam from its receivership.

Rootes Securities announced In the summer of 1935 they had at last bought Sunbeam and its subsidiary Sunbeam Commercial Vehicles from the receiver.

The former Talbot business in France had long been committed under an option to the manager of the Suresnes plant, Antonio Lago, while its STD commitments were clarified (completed with the sale of Sunbeam) and once that was fixed SA Talbot's commitments to its French bankers were cleared — after (lengthy) negotiation.

Meanwhile, other group members were sold and STD Motors was finally liquidated in 1936.

In popular culture

The main vintage motorcar featured in the 1953 film Genevieve is a Darracq, of the two-cylinder 10/12 HP type, built in Paris in 1904.

References

Footnotes

Other sources
Northey, Tom, "Land-speed  record: The Fastest Men on Earth", in Northey, Tom, ed. World of Automobiles (London: Orbis, 1974), Volume 10, pp. 1161–1166. London: Orbis, 1974.
Setright, L.J.K. "Opel: Simple Engineering and Commercial Courage", in Northey, Tom, ed. World of Automobiles, Volume 14, pp. 1583–1592. London: Orbis, 1974.
Wise, David Burgess. "Darracq: A Motor Enthusiast who Hated Driving", in Northey, Tom, ed. World of Automobiles, Volume 5, pp. 493–494. London: Orbis, 1974.
Wise, David Burgess. "Vanderbilt Cup: The American Marathon", in Northey, Tom, ed. World of Automobiles, Volume 21, pp. 2458–60-4. London: Orbis, 1974.

External links

 YouTube videos
The Darracq site of the British Sunbeam-Talbot-Darracq register
The Darracq V-8 world record car history and restoration

S T D Motors
Rootes Group
Defunct motor vehicle manufacturers of France
Vehicle manufacturing companies established in 1896
Vehicle manufacturing companies disestablished in 1935
French companies established in 1896
1935 disestablishments in France
Suresnes